WMKD (105.5 FM, "Country 105," formerly known as "Big Country 105.5") is a country music formatted radio station serving Pickford, Michigan and the Sault Ste. Marie, Michigan & Ontario markets. WMKD's 55,000-watt signal covers most of the eastern Upper Peninsula and far northern lower Michigan.

Although a construction permit for 105.5 WADW was granted in 1993, the station did not sign on until 2001. WADW was originally known as "Memories 105.5" and aired a mix of oldies from the late 1960s to the early 1980s, marking the first time an oldies station had been on the air in the Sault Ste. Marie area. The station was soon sold to Starboard Media and was taken silent while Starboard prepared to broadcast its Relevant Radio Catholic religious format on 105.5. WADW broadcast intermittently through the next three years, alternating between periods of silence and automated new age/smooth jazz music. In the summer of 2005, Starboard sold the station to current owners Northern Star Broadcasting, who changed the call-sign to WMKD in November of that year, and briefly turned it into a simulcast of Traverse City modern rock station WJZJ. The station debuted its current country music format a few months later, maintaining a similar playlist & branding as WMKC in St. Ignace/Indian River. Northern Star Broadcasting sold the station to Sovereign Communications in 2010.

Syndicated programming at WMKD includes the morning drive program Big D and Bubba, Country Top 30 with Bobby Bones, and The Lia Show, while the station also broadcasts Monster Energy NASCAR Cup Series races and Eastern Upper Peninsula Athletic Conference basketball & football games. Local on-air personalities include DJs Allan Gibbs and Mark SanAngelo, and chief meteorologist Karl Bohnak.

Sources 
Michiguide.com - WMKD History

External links
WMKD website

MKD-FM
Country radio stations in the United States
Radio stations established in 2001